Rick Fairless is a maker of custom choppers. His business, Strokers Dallas, sells custom choppers in Dallas, Texas.

Life

Rick Fairless has a regular radio show on KRLD-FM in Dallas/Fort Worth: The Texas Hardtails Scooter Show. He now produces the show from his shop and video podcasts can be seen at his website. 

Fairless has appeared on Discovery Channel's Biker Build-Off and SPEED Network's Texas Hardtails.  Examples of his custom and theme choppers are shown in the book Choppers: Heavy Metal Art.  In 2008, the William J. Clinton Presidential Center exhibited bikes by custom builders, and two Fairless choppers, Coors and Bettie, were included.

References

External links
Official site

Businesspeople from Texas
Motorcycle builders
Living people
Year of birth missing (living people)